This is a list of Zimbabwe women's One-day international cricketers. A One Day International, or an ODI, is an international cricket match between two representative teams, each having ODI status. An ODI differs from Test matches in that the number of overs per team is limited, and that each team has only one innings. Zimbabwe women were granted ODI status by the International Cricket Council (ICC) in April 2021. Zimbabwe women played their first ODI on 5 October 2021, during their four-match series against Ireland.

The list is arranged in the order in which each player won her first ODI cap. Where more than one player won her first ODI cap in the same match, those players are listed alphabetically by surname.

Key

Players 
Statistics are correct as of 27 November 2021.

See also
List of Zimbabwe women Twenty20 International cricketers

References 

Zimbabwe